The Jamaican ameiva (Pholidoscelis dorsalis) is a species of lizard found only in Jamaica.

Taxonomy
The Jamaican ameiva was described in 1838 as Ameiva dorsalis. In 2016, the species was moved to Pholidoscelis based on genetic sequencing and phylogenetic analyses.

Biology
The Jamaican ameiva is a diurnal lizard with an omnivorous diet, including members of its species. It is found in mesic to dry habitats near the sea, in gardens and vegetated duneland, associated with Coccoloba and Ipomea plant species.

Conservation
The Jamaican ameiva historically occurred throughout the lowlands of Jamaica and its cays in scattered subpopulations, though 7 of the 10 mainland subpopulations are considered possibly extinct. It persists on at least 4 cays offshore of the mainland. It is considered an endangered species on the IUCN Red List.

References

Pholidoscelis
Lizards of the Caribbean
Endemic fauna of Jamaica
Reptiles of Jamaica
Reptiles described in 1838
Taxa named by John Edward Gray